Victor J. McKinney (c. 1945 – 1987) was a Northern Irish footballer who played as a left winger.

Career
Born in Lurgan, McKinney played for Glenavon, Falkirk, Addington/Durban Spurs, Durban United and Cape Town City. He also earned one cap for the Northern Ireland national team.

He died in a car accident in 1987, in which his son, also called Victor, was paralysed.

References

1945 births
1987 deaths
Association footballers from Northern Ireland
Northern Ireland international footballers
Glenavon F.C. players
Falkirk F.C. players
Addington F.C. players
Durban United F.C. players
Cape Town City F.C. (NFL) players
NIFL Premiership players
Scottish Football League players
Association football wingers
Expatriate association footballers from Northern Ireland
Expatriate footballers in Scotland
Expatriate soccer players in South Africa
Expatriate sportspeople from Northern Ireland in South Africa
Road incident deaths in South Africa
National Football League (South Africa) players